Xenicotela bimaculata is a species of beetle in the family Cerambycidae. It was described by Maurice Pic in 1925. It is known from Vietnam.

References

Lamiinae
Beetles described in 1925